Perebor is a rural locality (a village) in Bereznikovskoye Rural Settlement, Sobinsky District, Vladimir Oblast, Russia. The population was 16 as of 2010.

Geography 
Perebor is located on the Klyazma River, 5 km southwest of Sobinka (the district's administrative centre) by road. Sobinka is the nearest rural locality.

References 

Rural localities in Sobinsky District